Char Minar, literally meaning "four towers" in Persian, may refer to:
 Charminar, a mosque in Hyderabad, India
 Charminar (2013 film), a 2013 Kannada film directed by R. Chandru
 Charminar (2018 film), a 2018 Indian film directed by Ajith C. Logesh
 Chauburji, a Mughal era monument in Lahore
 Chor Minar, a historic tower in Delhi, India
 Chor Minor, a mosque in Bukhara, Uzbekistan